Oriental Daily News is a Chinese-language newspaper in Hong Kong. It was established in 1969 by Ma Sik-yu and Ma Sik-chun, and was one of the two newspapers published by the Oriental Press Group Limited. Relative to other Hong Kong newspapers, Oriental Daily News has an older readership.

History
It is very rich in content – both text and pictures. It also adopts a sensational and critical style when reporting hard news. 

The paper has been number one in circulation since 1976, with a record readership of over 3,100,000. Apple Daily was its main competitor. While claimed figures are around the 3 million (approx 5.72 readers per copy) mark, Nielsen data from 2008 had the ODN at 1,762,000 (530,000 circulation), Apple Daily at 1,633,000 (347,000 circulation), The Sun at 537,000 readers (180,000 circulation) all also includes online readers.

Other selected readership figures as follows from full year 2008 and percentages of audience 12+ reached (including internet readers).

 Apple Daily (蘋果日報) 1,633,000 60%
 Oriental Daily News (東方日報) 1,762,000 33%
 The Sun (太陽報) 537,000 10%
 Ming Pao (明報) 447,000 8%
 South China Morning Post (南華早報) 296,000 6%
 Sing Tao Daily (星島日報) 339,000 6%
 Hong Kong Economic Times (經濟日報) 220,000 4%
 Sing Pao (成報) 61,000 1%
 Hong Kong Daily News (新報) 74,000 1%
 Hong Kong Economic Journal (信報) 74,000 1%
 Headline Daily (頭條日報) 1,093,000 20%
 Metro (都巿日報) 616,000 12%
 am730 623,000 12%

Content

The paper does not differ greatly from other Chinese papers in terms of content.  The newspaper provides daily coverage of local, international, financial, real-estate, entertainment, and sports news. Information on horse racing, football gambling, fashion trends and travel are also provided.

The Oriental Daily is credited for a couple of breakthroughs. In 1977, it was the first local paper to launch a complaint page. These complaints could be against both public agencies (including governmental departments) and private companies. Readers can phone, fax or even complain through the internet using a realtime conference system. If the reporters find the complaints interesting, they will investigate and report them, acting as a sort of ombudsman for their readers. This has contributed to the local newspaper's role as an influential channel for citizens to express their ideas and articulate their antipathy. The complaint page also reports on the response from the target of the complaints. It thus tries to stay neutral and fair, aiming only to arouse public awareness on the issues.

Facing keen competition, Oriental Daily tries hard to keep up with the city's pace. For instance, new columns like 'new arrivals' postbox' were set up to accommodate the needs of mainland readers.  A new soccer gambling page was also launched, with information on current odds.

Its editorial is one of a kind. It has two editorials every day. The first one is called the 'Main Editorial' (正論), which is a typical newspaper editorial. The second one is called 'Kung Fu Tea' (功夫茶), which is written in the vernacular form of Cantonese, and is a daily critique of the misfits of the bureaucracy.

Internet service

Oriental Daily, like many newspapers, has its own website. It provides readers free access to full version, up-to-date news.

On.cc is the flagship website of the Oriental Press Group Limited. It was started in February 2002, and includes e-paper versions of Oriental Daily. The whole printed version is uploaded onto the web allowing people from all over the world to read.

Competition and new developments

Apple Daily, established in 1995, was the paper's main competitor. The two entered into a price war in December 1995. When Apple Daily reduced its price to HK$4, Oriental Daily responded by dropping its price to $2, in an effort to retain market share. During and after this war, six newspapers closed down due to persistent losses, driving out competitors such as Hong Kong Daily News, Sing Pao Daily News and Tin Tin News. The competition has led to changes in the paper's presentation, with more use of colour photos and illustrations.

Competition also improved service quality, such as the introduction of customer service centres. Readers can report their complaints by visiting these centres in Tsim Sha Tsui and Wan Chai. Inside the centre, complaints can be lodged face-to-face to reporters via a digital video conversation system.

Recently, Oriental Press Group Limited would like to extend its business to America and Canada. Cities like New York and Toronto which have high population of Chinese will be its first target.

See also
 Media of Hong Kong
 List of newspapers in Hong Kong
 Newspaper Society of Hong Kong
 Hong Kong Audit Bureau of Circulations

References

External links
   
 Oriental Press Group at Bloomberg Markets
CNN: Two fugitive opium dealers, a media mogul and an alleged smoking gun video: the story of a Hong Kong newspaper feud

Chinese-language newspapers published in Hong Kong
Publications established in 1969